The 1966–67 season was the 52nd in the history of the Isthmian League, an English football competition.

Sutton United were champions, winning their first Isthmian League title.

League table

References

Isthmian League seasons
I